The 2006–07 Boston College Eagles men's basketball team played college basketball for the Boston College Eagles in the Atlantic Coast Conference. In 2005–06, they went 28–8 (11–5 ACC).

Roster

Schedule and results

|-
!colspan=9 style=| Regular Season

|-
!colspan=9 style=| ACC Tournament

|-
!colspan=9 style=| NCAA Tournament

References

Boston College Eagles men's basketball seasons
Boston College
Boston College
Boston College Eagles men's basketball
Boston College Eagles men's basketball
Boston College Eagles men's basketball
Boston College Eagles men's basketball